Something to Wrestle with Bruce Prichard is an audio podcast that discusses topics, events, wrestlers and memorable moments through the lens of WWE executive Bruce Prichard. The show was launched in August 2016 on MLW Radio. The episodes' length typically ranges from two to four hours, and include discussions about previous WWE pay-per-views and former WWE wrestlers. A video version of the podcast called Something Else to Wrestle with Bruce Prichard debuted on the WWE Network on April 18, 2018. Season one has 13 episodes.

Format
The podcast is co-hosted by Conrad Thompson. Thompson sits down with Bruce Prichard, a former WWE executive who performed on camera and was behind the scenes with the company for over twenty years. Each week, Thompson and Prichard discuss a new topic which is typically a particular WWE event, WWE happening or WWE character. Prichard discusses his experiences and recalls the topic of the episode from his perspective. Initially, the topic of each episode was voted on by the fans through Facebook or Twitter, however following Prichard's return to WWE in 2019 causing a more limited recording schedule, Thompson and Prichard now determine the topics in advance. A version of the podcast is available without commercials for a fee. The free version of the podcast contains approximately 20-25 minutes of audio commercials per hour.

Reception
In 2017, Something to Wrestle with Bruce Prichard won two awards. The Academy of Podcasters named the podcast its Sports & Recreation podcast of the year. In addition, Sports Illustrated named the podcast its Sports Podcast of the Year in its annual Sports Media Awards.

Spin-offs
On January 30, 2017, Thompson launched a second show with former WCW announcer Tony Schiavone titled What Happened When available on MLW Radio discussing stories from Jim Crockett Promotions and World Championship Wrestling.

In April 2018, another spin-off launched with Thompson and former WCW president Eric Bischoff known as 83 Weeks, covering the same topics as What Happened When, but from the perspective of Bischoff, who ran WCW from 1994 through 1999.

In April 2018, Prichard and Thompson began doing a show for the WWE Network titled Something Else to Wrestle with Bruce Prichard. The show has the same format as the original podcast, the only difference between the two being that Something Else to Wrestle is a video version of the show. The first episode was on April 18, 2018.

In May 2019, Thompson began another spin-off with former WCW and WWE talent, and current All Elite Wrestling commentator Jim Ross, known as Grilling JR.

In January 2021, another spin-off was launched this time featuring WWE Hall of Famer Kurt Angle, known as The Kurt Angle Show.

Live shows
Unlike the audio podcast, the show will sometimes feature guests such as Pat Patterson and Jeff Jarrett. Something to Wrestle no longer does live shows as of Bruce Prichard's return to WWE in early 2019.

Episodes

References

External links
 

2016 podcast debuts
Audio podcasts
Professional wrestling-related mass media
Professional wrestling podcasters
WWE Network shows
Entertainment-related YouTube channels
History of WWE